Volkmar Groß (31 January 1948 – 3 July 2014) was a German professional footballer who played as a goalkeeper. He spent seven seasons in the Bundesliga with Hertha BSC, Tennis Borussia Berlin and FC Schalke 04. He represented Germany once in a friendly against Greece. He scored one goal in the Bundesliga from a penalty kick.

Career
Groß was born in Berlin. In 1967, he began his career with Hertha BSC. In 1971, Groß received a 15,000 Deutsche Mark fine as a result of an investigation into a match fixing scheme. He was suspended for two years from the Bundesliga and banned for life from the national team. During those two years, he played for Hellenic FC in South Africa as due to UN Sanctions against this country, South Africa was not a member of FIFA. In 1977, he returned to Germany and joined Tennis Borussia Berlin.

In 1979, Groß moved to the United States and signed with the Minnesota Kicks of the North American Soccer League. He began the season in Minnesota, but finished it with the San Diego Sockers. He would go on to play five outdoor, two NASL indoor and one Major Indoor Soccer League seasons with the Sockers before retiring in 1984.

Groß died on 3 July 2014 after a long illness.

Honours 
 UEFA Cup finalist: 1974–75

See also 
 Bundesliga scandal (1971)

References

External links 
 
 
 
 NASL/MISL stats

1948 births
2014 deaths
Footballers from Berlin
German footballers
Germany international footballers
Association football goalkeepers
Bundesliga players
Major Indoor Soccer League (1978–1992) players
North American Soccer League (1968–1984) indoor players
North American Soccer League (1968–1984) players
Hertha BSC players
Hellenic F.C. players
FC Twente players
Tennis Borussia Berlin players
FC Schalke 04 players
Minnesota Kicks players
San Diego Sockers (NASL) players
San Diego Sockers (original MISL) players
West German expatriate footballers
Expatriate soccer players in South Africa
Expatriate footballers in the Netherlands
Expatriate soccer players in the United States
West German expatriate sportspeople in South Africa
West German expatriate sportspeople in the Netherlands
West German expatriate sportspeople in the United States
West German footballers